The Old Hamilton Library is a historic library building at 3006 Hamilton Avenue in Baltimore, Maryland. The three story masonry Beaux Arts building was constructed in 1920 in the Hamilton neighborhood of the city as a branch of the Enoch Pratt Free Library. The building was designed by architect Theodore Wells Pietsch I, who designed a number of other Baltimore landmarks, and funded in part by a grant from steel baron and philanthropist Andrew Carnegie. The building served as a library until 1959, after which it was converted to commercial office use.

The building was listed on the National Register of Historic Places in 2012.

See also
National Register of Historic Places listings in East and Northeast Baltimore
List of Carnegie libraries in Maryland

References

External links 
 Old Hamilton Library – Explore Baltimore Heritage

Library buildings completed in 1920
Libraries on the National Register of Historic Places in Baltimore
Beaux-Arts architecture in Maryland
Buildings and structures in Baltimore
Carnegie libraries in Maryland